Agrypnetes is a monotypic genus of caddisflies belonging to the family Phryganeidae. The only species is Agrypnetes crassicornis.

The species was described by McLachlan in 1876.

It is native to Northern Europe.

References

Trichoptera
Trichoptera genera
Monotypic insect genera